The Rasa Komuter station is a Malaysian commuter train station stationed at the northern side of and named after the town of Rasa, Hulu Selangor, Selangor. The station was opened on April 21, 2007 alongside the Batang Kali and Serendah stations. It was the third stop in the Rawang-Tanjung Malim shuttle service (formerly known as the Rawang-Kuala Kubu Bharu shuttle service) until the service was merged with the Port Klang Line in 2016.

The station, as are all the other stations along the shuttle route (except the Tanjung Malim Komuter station), is situated along two railways with two platforms like most station halts along KTM Komuter lines, but contains facilities normally reserved for medium-to-large stations along three or more lines. In addition to ticketing facilities and basic amenities, the station contains spaces for administrative occupants, as well as a "kiosk" and an additional foot bridge (fused with a foot bridge exclusively for Komuter users) for pedestrians that simply intend to cross the railway lines. The station also includes low-tech support for disabled passengers. The station exits southwest towards a branch road that leads into the town centre of Rasa.

The Rasa station's two side platforms are designated as platform 1 (adjoining the main station building at the west, intended for northbound trains) and platform 2 (at the east, intended for southbound trains).

See also

 Seremban Line

References
 

Rawang-Seremban Line
Railway stations in Selangor